The Medyo Late Night Show with Jojo A. (originally, Jojo A. All the Way) is a Philippine television late night talk show hosted and produced by Jojo Alejar that aired in various Philippine television networks. It debuted on May 10, 2004 on DZRJ-TV.

History

Jojo A. All the Way / The Sobrang Gud Nite Show with Jojo A. (All the Way) / The Good Night Show (2004–2008)
The program debuted on RJTV as Jojo A. All the Way in 2004. The show was renamed The Sobrang Gud Nite Show with Jojo A. (All the Way) after moving to Q (then GMA News TV, now GTV) on October 5, 2007. The show was renamed The Good Night Show in 2008.

Jojo A. All the Way (2009–2013)
The program reverted to its original title Jojo A. All The Way when it moved to TV5 on June 1, 2009. The show ended on September 27, 2013, due to the network's lineup revamp.

The Medyo Late Night Show with Jojo A. (2014, 2015, 2018, 2020)
On January 6, 2014, The Medyo Late Night Show With Jojo A. premiered on GMA Network It ran until on December 5, 2014.

On May 10, 2015, the program returned to TV5 after a one-season run on GMA-7. On May 11, 2015, the program aired at 11:30 pm, also the show's 10th anniversary as the longest running comedy variety talk show on Philippine TV. On November 6, 2015, the show ended once again.

The program moved to PTV on April 30, 2018, airing at 11 pm. The show ran until November 16, 2018.

On February 6, 2020, the program returned to its original network RJDigiTV. The program aired live episodes every Thursday Night at 9 pm to 10 pm.

Re-runs
RJTV briefly re-aired archived episodes of Jojo A. All the Way (2004–2007) as part of its digital test broadcast beginning June 6, 2018.

TV5 briefly re-aired archived episodes of The Medyo Late Night Show With Jojo A. (2015) every Monday to Friday, 12:30 a.m., beginning June 7, 2021. It later moved to 12:00 midnight on TV5's "Todo Max Late Night" block.

Format
Similar to American late night talk shows, the show begins with a monologue by Alejar. Alejar then introduces the house band as he proceeds to his desk. After that are the different segments such as "Words of Wisdom". He then introduces his guest and conducts an interview. He also has a segment called "Anak ng Photo". Gravure idol China Roces delivers the "Cool News" segment as Alejar's introduce Roces as "China-kamakulit", "China-kasexy" and "China-kamaganda".

After the interview, Alejar introduces an up-and-coming band to end the show.

References

External links
 

2004 Philippine television series debuts
2010s Philippine television series
2020s Philippine television series
Filipino-language television shows
TV5 (Philippine TV network) original programming
GMA Network original programming
People's Television Network original programming
Philippine television talk shows
Q (TV network) original programming